Glenesslin may refer to:

 Glenesslin farmhouse, Dunscore, Scotland, United Kingdom
 Glenesslin shipwreck, Oregon, United States